The  Austro-Daimler 6 was a series of Austrian six-cylinder water-cooled inline SOHC aero engines first produced in 1910 by the Austro-Daimler company.

Design and development
The first Austro-Daimler six-cylinder engine was designed by Dr-Ing Ferdinand Porsche to be an aircraft engine from the outset. Of high quality manufacture, the Austro-Daimler was modestly rated at relatively low rpm, which gave the engine family a reputation for robustness and reliability.

Features of the Austro-Daimler included welded steel water jackets (originally copper), seven main bearings and large diameter inclined inlet and exhaust valves opened by dual action push-pull rods and closed by spring pressure. The single-overhead cam valvetrain was driven from the crankshaft through the usual vertically-oriented shaft as the contemporary Mercedes D.III was, but the Austro-Daimler had its vertical camshaft drive system mounted at the front of the engine instead, and not the usual aft-end placement of other Central Powers straight-six "SOHC" liquid-cooled aircraft powerplants, like the Mercedes and BMW designs.  

The Austro-Daimler inspired many imitators such as the Mercedes D.II, Benz Bz.IV, Beardmore, and Hiero 6. Limited availability of the Austro-Daimler engines forced some aircraft manufacturers to substitute Mercedes (the German Daimler company) engines in their aircraft, due to greater availability.

Variants
''Data from:
Austro-Daimler 90 hp 6-cyl.
The original low capacity version developing , introduced in 1910. 
Austro-Daimler 120 hp 6-cyl.
Austro-Daimler 160 hp 6-cyl.
developing , introduced in 1913.
Austro-Daimler 185 hp 6-cyl.
developing , introduced in 1916.
Austro-Daimler 200 hp 6-cyl.
Austro-Daimler 210 hp 6-cyl.
, introduced in late 1917.
Austro-Daimler 225 hp 6-cyl.
developing , introduced in 1918.

Applications
  Albatros D.II (Oef) (Austro-Daimler 185 hp 6-cyl.)
 Albatros D.III (Oef) (Austro-Daimler 200 hp 6-cyl.)
 Aviatik B.I
 Aviatik B.II
 Aviatik D.I
 Etrich VII
 Hansa-Brandenburg C.I
 Hansa-Brandenburg D.I
 Lohner C.I
 Lohner Type AA (Austro-Daimler 185 hp 6-cyl.)

Specifications (Austro-Daimler 120 hp)

See also

Footnotes

References

 

 

 

 

1910s aircraft piston engines
Austro-Daimler
Straight-six engines